"I'll Make a Man of You" is a World War I recruiting song that was sung across Britain in hopes of rallying young men to enlist in the military. It is sung from a flirtatious young woman's perspective of how she dates military men in order to turn them into better soldiers. It was written and composed by Arthur Wimperis and Herman Finck in 1914. The song was also showcased in Frank Lloyd's Cavalcade, and in the musical and film Oh, What a Lovely War!.

This song is well known for spawning numerous obscene parody versions which were performed in music halls during World War I and World War II, and are often still sung by serving soldiers today. One of the most notable of these parodies was "I don't want to join the Army", a sanitized version of which also featured in Oh, What a Lovely War!.

Lyrics

References

1914 songs
British songs
Songs of World War I